Dewan Sirajul Huq was a Bangladesh Nationalist Party politician and the former member of parliament from Comilla-4 (at present Brahmanbaria-4). He was a personal associate of the former president of Bangladesh Ziaur Rahman. He was also one of the founding members of the Bangladesh Nationalist Party.

Early life and education
Huq was born in a renowned family of Akhaura, Brahmanbaria. His father Akbar Ali Munshi was a preacher of Islam religion. Huq passed his Intermediate and Bachelor’s from Comilla Victoria Government College.

Career
Huq was the elected vice president of Comilla Victoria Government College Central Students Union. In 1969, he became the general secretary of East Pakistan Road Transport Corporation Workers' Union. Huq was elected to the parliament from Comilla-4 (at present Brahmanbaria-4) as a Bangladesh Nationalist Party candidate in 1979. He had served as a close personal associate of the then president of Bangladesh Ziaur Rahman. He was one of the founding members of Bangladesh Nationalist Party (BNP). Huq had served as the general secretary of Bangladesh Mazdoor Federation. After the assassination of President Ziaur Rahman, Huq became shattered and lost his interest in active politics.

Personal life
Huq married a schoolteacher named Afroza Begum. Together they had three daughters- Moina, Rumana & Rubaba and a son-Habib Abdullah Zaki, who was the youngest. His son died in the year 2009 due to kidney failure.

References

Bangladesh Nationalist Party politicians
Living people
2nd Jatiya Sangsad members
People from Comilla District
Year of birth missing (living people)